Wilhelm Reichert (born 31 March 1896, date of death unknown) was a German rower. He competed in the men's eight event at the 1928 Summer Olympics.

References

1896 births
Year of death missing
German male rowers
Olympic rowers of Germany
Rowers at the 1928 Summer Olympics
Sportspeople from Addis Ababa